Don't Hold Others Back is an advertisement created by Connex Melbourne to encourage courtesy on the Melbourne Rail Network (Metlink) by implying that delays to a train which causes delays on the network are caused by people holding the doors open for other people, standing near the doorway when there are seats available, banging on the doors or hassling the train driver to open them.

The music for the advertisement, an evocative Stalinist mood-piece titled No(t) Home, was written especially for the video by Russian born, Tasmanian based singer Zulya Kamalova, a leading proponent of Tatar music in Australia.

External links
 https://web.archive.org/web/20060820051251/http://www.dontholdothersback.com/ Official website which features more information and the option to view the television advertisement.
 https://web.archive.org/web/20091112021151/http://www.connexmelbourne.com.au//index.php?id=46 Official website of Connex Melbourne.
 
 http://www.zulya.com/ Official website of Zulya Kamalova

Public transport in Melbourne
Australian advertising slogans
2006 neologisms